Gidan Mangoro is a town in Karu, Nasarawa State.

References

Populated places in Nasarawa State